Crambidia scoteola is a moth of the family Erebidae. It was described by George Hampson in 1900. It is found in Bolivia.

References

Lithosiina
Moths described in 1900